{{Automatic taxobox
| fossil_range = Middle Pleistocene-Early Holocene (Uquian-Lujanian)~
| image = Nothrotherium.JPG
| image_caption = Skull of Nothrotherium
| taxon = Nothrotherium
| authority = Lydekker, 1889
| synonyms = {{Species list
  |Coelodon|Lund, 1838
  |Caelodon|Lund, 1839
  |Coclodon|Lund, 1839
  |Cyclodon|Lund, 1839
  |Toelodon|Lund, 1840 
  |Hypocoelus|Ameghino, 1891  }}
| subdivision_ranks = Species
| subdivision = 
 N. maquinense Lund, 1839
 N. escrivanense Reinhardt, 1878
}}Nothrotherium is an extinct genus of medium-sized ground sloth from South America (Bolivia, Brazil and the Ware Formation, La Guajira, Colombia). It differs from Nothrotheriops in smaller size and differences in skull and hind leg bones, but both genera can be traced back to Hapalops, the genus which both evolved from in different ecological conditions.

TaxonomyNothrotherium is derived from the Greek nothros [νωθρός], meaning "lazy" or "slothful," and therion [θηρίον], "beast", and the species N. maquinense is named after the Maquiné Grotto in Brazil, where it was found. Synonyms such as Coelodon occasionally cause confusion where they occur in early texts such as that of Alfred Russel Wallace's major work, The Geographical Distribution of Animals (1876). This genus formerly included the species Nothrotheriops shastensis, which was later moved to Nothrotheriops.

Description
Analysis of a coprolite associated with a N. maquinense skeleton in Brazil's Gruta dos Brejoes show it to have been a browser which fed on xerophytic leaves and fruits, and it is sometimes thought to have been an inhabitant of open, peripheral forests, possibly having a semi-arboreal lifestyle, like the contemporaneous Cuban ground sloths and Diabolotherium. Plant material in the Gruta dos Brejoes coprolite yielded a date of 12,200 ± 120 yr BP.

 References 

 Bibliography 
 

 Further reading 
 Classification of Mammals'' by Malcolm C. McKenna and Susan K. Bell

Prehistoric sloths
Prehistoric placental genera
Pleistocene xenarthrans
Pleistocene first appearances
Holocene extinctions
Pleistocene mammals of North America
Pleistocene Mexico
Fossils of Mexico
Pleistocene mammals of South America
Uquian
Ensenadan
Lujanian
Pleistocene Bolivia
Fossils of Bolivia
Pleistocene Brazil
Holocene Brazil
Fossils of Brazil
Pleistocene Colombia
Fossils of Colombia
Fossil taxa described in 1889
Taxa named by Richard Lydekker